Robin Cowan is a Canadian former pair skater. With partner Sherri Baier, he won the World Junior Championships in  1976, its inaugural year, and then went on to win the Canadian national championships in 1978.

Results
pairs with Sherri Baier

References

External links
 Pairs on Ice: Baier & Cowan

Canadian male pair skaters
Living people
World Junior Figure Skating Championships medalists
Year of birth missing (living people)